Toulouse Olympique Broncos are a semi-professional rugby league team based in Toulouse in the south of France. Formerly called Toulouse Jules-Julien Broncos XIII the club changed name at the end of the 2011-12 season after being taken over by  Toulouse Olympique. Formed in 1980, they currently play in the Elite One Championship

History 

Founded in 1980 as Association Sportive Toulouse Jules-Julien XIII the club joined the amateur ranks in rugby league. In 1987 a youth academy was set up running teams from 4 years and up. The club was promoted in 1994 after winning the National Division 2 title. During the following season the club, after getting into financial trouble, had to withdraw from the league. It wasn't until 2010 that a senior side reappeared, they were created to compete in the Elite Two Championship. During this time the youth sides had still competed. Before the 2012/13 season had started, the senior side moved under the umbrella of city neighbours Toulouse Olympique changing their name to the current one used today. In 2015 following Toulouse Olympique's acceptance into the British League 1 competition, the Broncos were moved up to the Elite One Championship to replace the departing Toulouse club and to also act as their feeder team, while also maintaining a Toulouse presence in the French League.

The original club name Toulouse Jules-Julien XIII lives on to this day at academy level with teams from ages 4 to 20.

Colours and badge 

The original club played in predominantly red with yellow, after being taken over the club used the same colours as their parent club, blue and white. They have retained their nickname 'Broncos'. The academy sides still play in the original colours

Stadium 

The club's first stadium was the Stade Philippe Struxiano named after a former player from the 1920s. In 2014 they moved to their current home the Stade des Minimes or as its also known Stade Arnauné the current capacity is 4,066 but this will be increased to about 10,000 in the coming years.

Current squad 
2021-22 Season

Honours

 National Division 2 (1): 1993-94

References 

French rugby league teams
Toulouse Olympique
1980 establishments in France
Rugby clubs established in 1980
Sport in Toulouse